Adesso is the sixth studio album released by Mango, in 1987.

The album is known for the single "Bella d'estate", which was co-written with Lucio Dalla. Singer's brother Armando Mango contributed to the songwriting. The Cd version contains two additional tracks: "Inseguendo il vento" and "Dove andrò", the latter from the album Australia (1985).

The album was released in Spain under the name Ahora.

Track listing

Adesso

Ahora
 "Flor de verano" 
 "Arcobaleni" 
 "Attimi" 
 "Raggio di sole" 
 "Dal cuore in poi" 
 "Noche latina" 
 "Estrella del norte" 
 "Sogni"
 "Hábitos" 
 "Sensazione d'aria"

Charts

Personnel
Mango - lead vocals, choir, keyboards
Graziano Accinni - guitar
Rocco Petruzzi - keyboards, drums concept
Luca Malaguti - bass on "Sera Latina"
Aldo Banfi - keyboards on "Dove andrò"
Mauro Paoluzzi - guitar on "Dove andrò"
Lele Melotti - drums, percussion on "Dove andrò"

References 

Mango albums
1987 albums